The World Deaf Badminton Championships are organized by Comité International des Sports des Sourds since 2003. They are held every four years.

Championships

World Youth Deaf Badminton Championships

Medalists

External links
http://www.deaflympics.com/sports/index.asp?SC=Badminton

Deaf
Parasports world championships
Badm
Recurring sporting events established in 2003